The 2nd Filipino Academy of Movie Arts and Sciences Awards Night was held in 1954 in Life Theater, Quezon Boulevard, Quiapo, Manila. Huk Sa Bagong Pamumuhay, produced by Narcisa de Leon and distributed by LVN Pictures, is the recipient of FAMAS Award for Best Picture.

Awards
Winners are listed first and highlighted with boldface.

References

External links
The Unofficial Website of the Filipino Academy of Movie Arts and Sciences
FAMAS Awards 

FAMAS Award
FAMAS
FAMAS